3-Fluorobenzoic acid is an organic compound with the formula C7H5FO2. It is the meta form of fluorobenzoic acid. Its conjugate base is 3-fluorobenzoate. The compound is an irritant. Its acidity (pKa) is lower than that of the ortho form (2-fluorobenzoic acid) but higher than that of the para form (4-fluorobenzoic acid). It has been used in a variety of scientific applications.

References

Benzoic acids
Fluoroarenes